Ephrat Livni, also known as el (born 1972), is an Israeli-American artist, writer and lawyer who creates large scale street art projects.

Biography
Livni wrote for the Jerusalem Report in Israel and for ABC News in New York.

Art career
She began selling Clothing from planet e., recycled, hand-sewn clothing, at the New York Sunday afternoon house party Body & Soul and in boutiques in SoHo and the East Village in 1998. the green clothing company was featured in The New York Times Sunday Styles print edition that same year> . The influence of years of stitching shows in her street art, for example, at a construction wall on the Jewish History Museum in Amsterdam, el stapled voodoo dolls made of business suits alongside giant wheat-pasted versions of the figures painted in acrylic.

Livni was inspired in 2005 by the British artist Banksy to distribute copies of her serialized novel Between Epiphanies in New York. The book was placed surreptitiously in subway ad spaces and other public and private places throughout the city. Fellow artist Win stenciled the faces of the literary and historical figures that appear in Between Epiphanies on the sidewalks and buildings of Brooklyn.

Wisconsin Public Radio's Radio Without Borders interviewed Livni about the book, which retells the Sufi adventure story, Conference of the Birds, in a postmodern context. The writer presented the novel and distribution campaign at the University of Wisconsin-Madison's "50th Anniversary of Peace Corps in Africa" Conference, where she was discussing her Peace Corps volunteer work in Senegal from 2001-2002 (for which artist Shepard Fairey did the commemorative poster ); she was also featured on National Public Radio's StoryCorps blog.
In 2010 and 2011 (between writing legal briefs and visiting jails) she began stickering up the signs on the island of Palm Beach and in West Palm Beach. Authority Issue  began with Livni placing her handmade stickers on street signs and buildings. She then photographed the signs with the stickers and made new stickers out of the photos, which she placed throughout the city, especially on street signs. These were then photographed and so on, with the artist intending to fill the city's public spaces with a bizarre and mystifying collage of warnings, threats and prohibitions.

In the summer of 2011, she began work on a new campaign, klompkunst, in Amsterdam. Klompkunst means "clog art" in Dutch and, klompkunst was a collection of hundreds of hand painted and silk screened clogs, a reference to early and late Andy Warhol works that also aimed to keep in mind local tradition.

Law career
In 2007, she began working as assistant public defender in Palm Beach County, providing publicly funded defense counsel to indigents in the criminal justice system in Florida.

References

Street artists
Florida lawyers
American people of Israeli descent
Peace Corps volunteers
Living people
1972 births
Public defenders